Maxwell Lattimer (born July 14, 1993) is a Canadian rower. He won a gold medal at the 2015 Pan American Games in the men's lightweight coxless four event.

In June 2016, he was officially named to Canada's 2016 Olympic team and placed 13th in the lightweight coxless four event.

He represented Canada at the 2020 Summer Olympics and placed 10th in the lightweight double sculls event.

References

External links
 

1993 births
Living people
Rowers at the 2015 Pan American Games
Pan American Games gold medalists for Canada
Canadian male rowers
Rowers from Vancouver
Rowers at the 2016 Summer Olympics
Olympic rowers of Canada
Pan American Games medalists in rowing
Medalists at the 2015 Pan American Games
Rowers at the 2020 Summer Olympics
21st-century Canadian people